Thiomicrospira siberica is a species of obligately alkaliphilic and obligately chemolithoautotrophic sulfur-oxidizing bacteria. It was first isolated from soda lakes in northern Russia, hence the specific epithet. In 2017, all 4 species of the genus Thioalkalimicrobium were reclassified to Thiomicrospira.

References

Further reading

Robb, Frank, et al., eds. Thermophiles: biology and technology at high temperatures. CRC Press, 2007.
Neilson, Alasdair H., and Ann-Sofie Allard. Organic Chemicals in the Environment: Mechanisms of Degradation and Transformation. CRC Press, 2012.

Verstraete, Willy, ed. Environmental Biotechnology ESEB 2004. CRC Press, 2004.

External links
LPSN

Piscirickettsiaceae
Bacteria described in 2001